Khamis al-Gudaymi is a sub-district located in Kharif District, 'Amran Governorate, Yemen. Khamis al-Gudaymi had a population of 14459 according to the 2004 census.

References 

Sub-districts in Kharif District